
Kępno County is a unit of territorial administration and local government (powiat) in Greater Poland Voivodeship, west-central Poland. It came into being on January 1, 1999, as a result of the Polish local government reforms passed in 1998.

As of 2006 its total population is 55,335, out of which the population of Kępno is 14,710 and the rural population is 40,625.

Neighbouring counties
Kępno County is bordered by Ostrzeszów County to the north, Wieruszów County to the east, Kluczbork County to the south, Namysłów County to the south-west and Oleśnica County to the west.

Administrative division
The county is subdivided into seven gminas (one urban-rural and six rural). These are listed in the following table, in descending order of population.

References
Polish official population figures 2006

 
Land counties of Greater Poland Voivodeship